Bob Simmons (born June 13, 1948) is a former American football player and coach.  He served as the head football coach at Oklahoma State University–Stillwater from 1995 to 2000, compiling a record of 30–38.  In 2013, he was hired as the head football coach at Boulder High School in Boulder, Colorado.

Current Substitute teacher

Head coaching record

College

References

1948 births
Living people
American football linebackers
Bowling Green Falcons football coaches
Bowling Green Falcons football players
Colorado Buffaloes football coaches
Notre Dame Fighting Irish football coaches
Oklahoma State Cowboys football coaches
Toledo Rockets football coaches
Washington Huskies football coaches
West Virginia Mountaineers football coaches
High school football coaches in Colorado
People from East Cleveland, Ohio
People from Livingston, Alabama
Sportspeople from Cuyahoga County, Ohio
Players of American football from Ohio
African-American coaches of American football
African-American players of American football
21st-century African-American people
20th-century African-American sportspeople